Menteith or Monteith, a district of south Perthshire, Scotland, roughly comprises the territory between the Teith and the Forth. Earlier forms of its name include Meneted, Maneteth and Meneteth. (Historically, the area between Callander and Dunblane was known in English by the similar name of the “Vale of Menteith”.)

Menteith encompasses the parishes of Callander, Aberfoyle, Port of Menteith, Kippen, Kilmadock, Kincardine, Lecropt and Dunblane.

Etymology
The name Menteith may be derived from the Brittonic cognate of Welsh mynydd (borrowed into Gaelic as monadh), meaning "mountain, muir", combined with river-name Teith (of obscure origin).
Alternatively, given the topography of the area the name is possibly derived from the Gaelic word moine, meaning Moss or Marsh, cognate with Teith'’.

History
In medieval Scotland, Menteith was a stewartry, and later an earldom, ruled by the earls of Menteith. Gilchrist is the first known earl. In Shakespeare's Macbeth, Menteth (sic) is one of the "noblemen of Scotland" appearing in Act V who allies himself with Malcolm and others to oppose Macbeth's usurpation.

The lands and the earldom passed to Walter Comyn (d. 1258) in right of his wife Isabella; then, through Isabella's sister Mary, to the  Stewarts; and finally to the Grahams. The earldom  became extinct in 1694, but because sheriffdoms had previously been introduced into Scotland, sheriffs were a ready-made alternative source of authority: Menteith was covered by the sheriffdom based at Perth.

When local government reforms in the mid-19th century replaced the ancient provinces with new counties (shires) that were coextensive with the sheriffdom boundaries, Menteith became the south-western portion of the newly created county, Perthshire.

Lake of Menteith
On Inchmahome (island of St Colmaig) stand the ruins of Inchmahome Priory, an Augustinian priory founded in 1238 by Walter Comyn, and built in the Early English style, with an ornate western doorway. Mary, Queen of Scots, when a child of four, lived on the island for a few weeks in 1548 before leaving for Dumbarton Castle on her way to France. On Inch Talla stands the ruined tower, dating from 1428, that belonged to the estate of the earls of Menteith. The village of the Port of Menteith lies on the north shore of the loch.

References

Watson, William J., The Celtic Place-names of Scotland.'' Revised with introduction by Simon Taylor. Edinburgh: Birlinn, 2004.

External links
Historic map showing Menteith beside Stirling & Lennox
Historic map showing Menteith in Scotland
Historic map showing Menteith in Scotland

Geography of Stirling (council area)